Euthalia malaccana, or Fruhstorfer's baron, is a species of nymphalid butterfly found in the Indomalayan realm

Subspecies
Euthalia malaccana malaccana Assam to Peninsular Malaya, Sumatra
Euthalia malaccana adeonides Fruhstorfer, 1904 Borneo
Euthalia malaccana rajana  Fruhstorfer, 1913 Bangka
Euthalia malaccana adinda  Fruhstorfer, 1913  Nias
Euthalia malaccana dharma  Roepke, 1938 Java
Euthalia malaccana regulus  Tsukada, 1991

References

malaccana
Butterflies of Asia
Butterflies of Indochina
Butterflies of Borneo
Butterflies of Indonesia
Butterflies of Java
Butterflies of Malaysia
Fauna of the Lesser Sunda Islands
Fauna of the Maluku Islands
Butterflies described in 1889